The U.S. Coalition for Fair Lumber Imports is a lobby group in the United States that has protested against alleged subsidies the Government of Canada has given members of its pulp and paper industry.

External links
 Organization website
 Wikitrade article on the Coalition for Fair Lumber Imports
 Globe and Mail story on lobby group's membership being accidentally disclosed

Political advocacy groups in the United States